William Leonard Higgitt (10 November 1917 – 2 April 1989) was the 14th Commissioner of the Royal Canadian Mounted Police (RCMP), holding office from 1969 to 1973, and President of the International Criminal Police Organization (Interpol) from 1972 to 1976. Leonard Higgitt's background in intelligence and counterintelligence with the RCMP, up to and during World War II, made him the preferred choice as RCMP Commissioner at what was the height of the Cold War. Higgitt also directed national security operations during the October Crisis of 1970, when members of the Front de libération du Québec (FLQ) kidnapped the provincial Labour Minister Pierre Laporte and British diplomat James Cross, events which saw then Canadian Prime Minister Pierre Trudeau invoke the War Measures Act, the first time in Canadian history that the Act was invoked during peacetime. As Commissioner, Higgitt also presided over the RCMP centenary.

Early life
Higgitt was born in Anerley, Saskatchewan in 1917, to Percy Higgitt and May Higgitt (née Hall). Percy Higgitt's family traces their roots to Sheffield, Yorkshire, and May Hall to Boston, Lincolnshire. Percy immigrated to Saskatchewan in 1908, meeting May Hall there and starting a farm. Leonard grew up in Anerley during the Depression years of the 1930s. His father gave up his farm homestead when Leonard was four to be an Imperial Oil agent and grain buyer for the Canadian Consolidated Grain Company; later taking over the local store and post office in Anerley, which he operated for over forty years. Percy also provided municipal public service in various capacities. After primary schooling, Leonard Higgitt went to high school in Saskatoon.

Career
After graduating from high school in 1937, at the age of nineteen, and two years before the breakout of World War II, Higgitt joined the RCMP at Regina, Saskatchewan. Here he completed recruit training, winning a medal for marksmanship, and became a stenographer at "F" Division headquarters. He remained in Regina, supervising general criminal files and engaging in active police investigations until the outbreak of the War. He was then posted to Ottawa, Ontario for special war duties and to serve in the Intelligence Branch. Higgitt became Government advisor to the Commons Judicial Committee on Internment Operations, a committee set up to identify and mitigate potential security risks to Canada and the Allied effort against Nazi Germany and Imperial Japan. Prior to the Allies' pivotal Normandy Landings, these operations led to the removal of several hundreds of German-, Italian- and Japanese-born Canadians to detention camps in Canada's hinterlands until the surrender of the Axis powers.

In 1945, Higgitt was a principal investigator of Igor Gouzenko, a cipher clerk for the Soviet Embassy to Canada who defected on September 5, three days after the official close of the War, with 109 documents on Soviet espionage activities in Canada and the United States. Higgitt was in charge of liaison with the special Crown prosecutors at the series of criminal trials related to Gouzenko and had control of the exhibits and documents. Gouzenko's defection was one of the major catalysts for the beginning of the Cold War, and compelled Higgitt and other RCMP leaders to organize a special counter-espionage section of the RCMP, which Higgitt headed until 1952. This was a forerunner of the RCMP's Security Service, a branch of the RCMP that had responsibility for domestic intelligence and security in Canada.

In 1952, Higgitt was commissioned as an officer and became Inspector and Personnel Officer in Ontario. He moved to western Quebec two years later to serve as Inspector at "C" Division, then was transferred to Montreal to take charge of the RCMP's Montreal Subdivision and supervise the RCMP's investigation and enforcement of the Canada Customs Act. He was posted to the RCMP's Security and Intelligence in Ottawa in 1957, specializing in counterintelligence. With the Security Service, Higgitt was involved in the investigations of Soviet KGB agents Nikolai Ostrovsky and Rem Krasilnikov, and the double-agent Yevgeni Brik. Three years later he was assigned to London, England, where he served as Liaison Officer with British Intelligence and, later, with Western Europe via the Canadian Delegation to the General Assemblies of Interpol. He remained at this post for three years, travelling extensively and working closely with police organizations and intelligence agencies throughout Europe. He returned to Ottawa in 1963, taking the position of RCMP Security Service Superintendent. In 1967, Higgitt became RCMP Assistant Commissioner and Director of Security and Intelligence.  In this capacity he worked closely with counterparts in the United States and Europe to monitor communist movements. Two years later, he was promoted to Deputy RCMP Commissioner and became Director of Operations for all Criminal and Security Service matters throughout Canada, and shortly afterward, on October 1, 1969, at the height of the Cold War, he was appointed RCMP Commissioner by Prime Minister Pierre Elliot Trudeau over several of his senior officers. This was the RCMP's fourteenth commissioner. Upon his appointment, The New York Times described Higgitt as being "in the tradition of quiet‐spoken, approachable but tough headed men who hardly ever, by word or deed, draw attention to themselves". Higgitt continued his duties as Commissioner on a one-year extension granted by Canada's Solicitor-General. Following his appointment as Commissioner, Higgitt was unanimously elected a vice-president of Interpol. Higgitt received a tipstaff at the 65th annual conference of the Canadian Association of Chiefs of Police, London, Ontario.

RCMP Commissioner 
One of the first questions posed to Higgitt upon his appointment as RCMP Commissioner was whether he thought a Chinese Communist Embassy in Ottawa would pose a new security problem for the federal police.  Higgitt's immediate answer, widely circulated throughout Canadian media, was that a Chinese Communist presence in Canada would indeed require heightened police vigilance; an answer which displeased Trudeau, who had pressed hard for Canada-China negotiations and a diplomatic exchange between Ottawa and Beijing. Higgitt's opinion was that the presence of a Communist Chinese embassy in Ottawa would increase espionage activity in Canada, even if diplomatic links might outweigh those disadvantages.  In May 1971, after Canada and China's Maoist Government had agreed to exchange ambassadors, Higgitt was asked, while testifying before the Commons Judicial Committee, if he maintained his 1969 position on China. To this Higgitt repeated that in 1969 "The obvious answer had to be yes". 

During his term in office, the RCMP Guidon was presented to the Force by Queen Elizabeth II, the first videofile system for storing and retrieving fingerprints was obtained, the Canadian Police Information Center (CPIC) with nationwide computer services was opened, and the creation of the Canadian Bomb Data Center was authorized. Higgitt directed RCMP operations during the FLQ Crisis in Quebec in 1970. Higgitt opposed the use of the War Measures Act by the Trudeau Government, which gave the police and military special powers to crack down on the FLQ. 

The October Crisis and the use of the War Measures Act led to an official critical review of the security and intelligence situation in Canada called The Royal Commission on Security, chaired by Maxwell Mackenzie. Upon completing its report, the Commission recommended that a new civilian non-police agency be established to perform the functions of a security service in Canada instead of the RCMP. This eventually led, in 1984, to the establishment of the Canadian Security Intelligence Service (CSIS), effectively creating a separation of domestic policing and foreign intelligence in Canada similar to the distinction between the FBI and the CIA in the United States. In an address to the Security Panel (a senior interdepartmental committee of officials), Higgitt termed the recommendation for a separate civilian intelligence service "a travesty of justice," and added that "the Soviet Intelligence would be jubilant. They could never hope to duplicate the accomplishment".

Higgitt was responsible for organizing the RCMP Centennial Celebrations in 1973, and in July of that year, in Standoff Alberta, was honored with a Kainai chieftainship by the Blood Indian Band. Higgitt was given the Blackfoot name "Great Chief" and was presented with a head-dress and peace pipe by Joe Chief Body. Higgitt was also appointed Commander of the Order of the Hospital of St. John of Jerusalem (Order of St. John) in 1973, and was awarded the Canadian Centennial Medal and the RCMP Long Service Medal.

President of Interpol
While serving in London, England as the RCMP Liaison Officer for the United Kingdom and Western Europe, Higgitt travelled widely and acquired valuable experience as a member of the Canadian Delegation to the General Assemblies of the International Criminal Police Organization (Interpol) in 1961, in Copenhagen, and 1962, in Madrid. As RCMP Commissioner he also led the Canadian Delegation to Mexico City in 1969. In 1971, while Higgitt was RCMP Commissioner, Canada and the RCMP hosted the 40th General Assembly of Interpol in Ottawa, which featured fifty delegations representing national policing organizations across the world. In 1972, at Interpol's 41st Plenary Meeting in Frankfurt, Higgitt was elected President of Interpol. This marked the first time a president from outside Europe was elected. Higgitt set currency counterfeiting and the growing global narcotics trade as Interpol's top priorities. Higgitt sought to keep politics out of Interpol, telling the London Sunday Times in 1974 that if Interpol became a political body like the United Nations, debating definitions of terrorism, it would find itself increasingly unsuccessful in its intelligence-gathering operations and eventually break apart.

Retirement 
Commissioner Higgitt retired from the RCMP on December 28, 1973; going on to serve for several years as president of Canada's Safety Council. He was called before the Commission of Inquiry Concerning Certain Activities of the RCMP in 1980, testifying that he, in his capacity as RCMP Commissioner, along with Director General of the RCMP's Security Service, John Starnes, had discussed with Cabinet Ministers and other senior Canadian Government officials the possibility of surveilling foreign agents via electronic eavesdropping, and of similar intelligence-gathering methods in the wake of the bombings during the FLQ crisis. Higgitt maintained that his "political masters" in Ottawa had given their implied consent to the use of wiretapping and other forms of electronic surveillance.

Higgitt died in Ottawa on April 2, 1989 and was buried in the RCMP cemetery in Regina, Saskatchewan.

References

External links
RCMP Museum -- Friendly Notes Vol.14, No.1, Winter 2004
Policing in Today's "Sophisticated" Society: An Address by Commissioner W. L. Higgitt, RCMP
Interpol History

1917 births
1989 deaths
Canadian civil servants
Royal Canadian Mounted Police commissioners